Wiltona is a monotypic genus of New Zealand false wolf spiders containing the single species, Wiltona filicicola. It was first described by Raymond Robert Forster in 1973 as Haurokoa filicicola. However, this name was already used for an extinct genus of triton shells, and it was renamed Wiltona by A. Ö. Koçak & M. Kemal in 2008.

See also
 List of Zoropsidae species

References

Monotypic Araneomorphae genera
Spiders of New Zealand
Zoropsidae